These are the official results of the Men's discus throw event at the 1994 European Championships in Helsinki, Finland, held at Helsinki Olympic Stadium on 12 and 14 August 1994. There were a total number of 21 participating athletes.

Medalists

Qualification
Held on 12 August 1994

Final
Held on 14 August 1994

Participation
According to an unofficial count, 21 athletes from 16 countries participated in the event.

 (1)
 (1)
 (2)
 (3)
 (1)
 (1)
 (1)
 (1)
 (1)
 (1)
 (1)
 (1)
 (2)
 (2)
 (1)
 (1)

See also
 1992 Men's Olympic Discus Throw (Barcelona)
 1993 Men's World Championships Discus Throw (Stuttgart)
 1995 Men's World Championships Discus Throw (Gothenburg)
 1996 Men's Olympic Discus Throw (Atlanta)

References

 Results
 Results European Championships Athletic 1934-2010 

Discus throw
Discus throw at the European Athletics Championships